Bébé is a song written by famous Senegalese international singer Youssou N'Dour and composed by Ibrahima N'Dour. This song appears in "Hétéroclite", a record of French singer Cynthia Brown. The music video (a making of the recording session) was shot by French filmmaker Jérémie Carboni.

References

External links
 Singer's official website.
 Coproducer's and director's official website.

Youssou N'Dour songs
Year of song missing